Richard L. Sattgast is an American politician who serves as the state auditor of South Dakota for the second time having served two terms previously (2003–2011). He formerly served as state treasurer (2011–2019).

Early life and education
Sattgast was born in Spearfish, South Dakota, graduating from Spearfish High School. He received a bachelor's degree from Black Hills State University and a master's degree from New Mexico Highlands University. Sattgast also served in the United States Army and in the South Dakota National Guard.

Career 
Sattgast was elected state auditor in 2002, defeating Democrat Dick Butler with 52% of the vote. He was reelected unopposed in 2006. In 2010, Sattgast ran for state treasurer and won, defeating Democrat Tom Katus with 65% of the vote. He was reelected as treasurer in 2014, defeating Democrat Denny Pierson and Libertarian Ken Santema with 61% of the vote.

Personal life
Sattgast and his wife, Donna, have four children.

References

External links
 State Treasurer website

|-

|-

21st-century American politicians
Black Hills State University alumni
Date of birth missing (living people)
Living people
New Mexico Highlands University alumni
People from Spearfish, South Dakota
South Dakota National Guard personnel
South Dakota Republicans
State Auditors of South Dakota
State treasurers of South Dakota
Year of birth missing (living people)